Oakmere is a village and former civil parish, now in the parish of Delamere and Oakmere, in Cheshire West and Chester, England.  It contains four buildings that are recorded in the National Heritage List for England as designated listed buildings, all of which are at Grade II.  This grade is the lowest of the three gradings given to listed buildings and is applied to "buildings of national importance and special interest".  The parish is entirely rural, and is traversed by the A556 road.

References
Citations

Sources

Listed buildings in Cheshire West and Chester
Lists of listed buildings in Cheshire